10 Bold is an Australian free-to-air digital television multichannel owned by Network 10. It originally launched on 26 March 2009 as One HD with a focus on broadcasting sports-based programming and events, but rebranded to One in April 2011 to more reality, scripted and adventure-based programming aimed at males between the ages of 25 to 54. As of October 2018, the channel now primarily broadcasts dramatic programming aimed towards viewers 40 and older.

Due to the relaunch of 10 HD on 2 March 2016, it was reduced to a standard-definition broadcast for 5 years until 23 September 2021 at 6am when it switched to HD.

History

Sports format channel 
The channel commenced broadcasting as One HD on 26 March 2009 at 7.00 pm in Melbourne (due to live coverage of the Australian Football League) and at 7.30 pm in Sydney, Brisbane, Adelaide and Perth. The channel, owned by Network Ten, featured nonstop sport content including live sport, sports documentaries and sports-themed movies.

One initially broadcast in high definition on digital channels 1 and 11 with a standard-definition simulcast on digital channel 12 known as One SD or One Digital. At launch, One replaced the previous Ten HD service and a standard-definition simulcast of Ten HD called TenSD2.

One HD began broadcasting on Macquarie Media Group's owned and operated Southern Cross Ten regional television stations on digital channel 50 at 7.00 pm on 2 July 2009. Tasmania didn't broadcast it until 30 July 2009, and Mildura didn't broadcast it until 1 December 2009.

The simulcast on digital channel 11 was later reallocated for Ten's standard-definition digital multichannel Eleven (now 10 Peach) on 15 December 2010 in preparation for its launch on 11 January 2011. As a result, the channel's high definition simulcast was moved to channel 12, replacing the standard-definition simulcast.

In 2011, the channel began to dilute its all-sport format to include adventure-themed reality programming such as Ice Road Truckers and Black Gold, and a weekly feature-length movie or documentary, usually, but not limited to, a sporting theme. In April 2011, it was revealed that the channel would shift to a more broad general entertainment channel aimed towards a younger male demographic, whilst still featuring sports programming.

Sports and entertainment channel 
It was confirmed on 4 April 2011 that due to unsupportable overheads associated with running the station as an "all-sport" channel, One HD would begin to air more general entertainment programming alongside sport, particularly shows aimed at an older male audience and would also be rebranded as One. The changes were intended to make the channel a greater competitor against 7mate, which has a similar scope, and took place on 7 May 2011.

One's updated schedule included factuals such as Everest: Beyond the Limit, Extreme Fishing with Robson Green, Airline, Long Way Round, Ice Road Truckers, An Idiot Abroad, Cops, dramas such as Terriers, Lights Out, Sons of Anarchy, Burn Notice, Breakout Kings and Psych and films such as The Last King of Scotland, 28 Weeks Later, Babylon AD, Jarhead, Pitch Black, Doom, Hitman,  The Manchurian Candidate and Walker Texas Ranger.

2018 rebrand 
On 31 October 2018, One relaunched as 10 Boss, as part of a larger rebranding of Network Ten. Chief content officer Beverley McGarvey described "Boss" as reflecting an overall "attitude" in its programming, exemplified by a focus on characters with "bold" personalities or could be reasonably described as being a "boss" (such as Judge Judy). 10 Boss primarily targets viewers over the age of 40, and focuses primarily on dramas (such as Madam Secretary and NCIS).

On 10 December 2018, the channel was renamed 10 Bold, due to trademark conflicts with Fairfax Media (which had completed its merger with Nine Entertainment Co.) and the Australian Financial Review publication Boss. A press release promoting the rebranding acknowledged the conflict, describing the change as being an "early Christmas present to Nine", and quipping that "it's better to be bold than bossy".

Programming
The channel targets a broad range of viewers, broadcasting programs from Australia, New Zealand, the United Kingdom, Canada, and the United States, and complementing existing programming on Ten.
Programs aired on the channel are scripted and adventure-based programming aimed at males between the ages of 25 to 54, mix of genres, including reality, lifestyle, drama, classic sitcoms from the 60s, 70s and 80s, comedies, live sport and action films.

As a result of the revival of 10 HD on 2 March 2016, the channel was reduced to standard definition.

Original programming

Current programming

Documentary

 48 Hours
 Bondi Rescue

Drama

 Bull
 The Code
 CSI: Crime Scene Investigation
 CSI: Miami
 Diagnosis Murder
 Hawaii Five-0
 In the Dark
 JAG
 Jake and the Fatman
 L.A.'s Finest
 Law & Order: Special Victims Unit
 The Love Boat
 MacGyver (1985 TV series)
 MacGyver (2016 TV series)
 Madam Secretary
 The Mentalist
 Mission: Impossible
 Nash Bridges
 NCIS
 NCIS: Los Angeles
 Ripper Street
 Scorpion
 Star Trek
 Star Trek: Enterprise
 Star Trek: The Next Generation
 Star Trek: Voyager
 S.W.A.T.
 Walker, Texas Ranger

Lifestyle

 Adventure Angler
 All 4 Adventure
 ETs Fishing Classics
 Extreme Fishing with Robson Green
 Fishing Edge
 The Home Team
 I Fish
 Into Water and Beyond
 Just Go
 Let's Do Coffee
 The Living Room
 The Offroad Adventure Show
 Pat Callinan's 4x4 Adventures
 Reel Action
 Reel Rock
 River to Reef
 Robson Green Extreme Fisherman
 Robson's Extreme Fishing Challenge
 What's Up Downunder

Talk show
 The Doctors

Reality
 Hunted
 Shark Tank
 Undercover Boss

Factual
 Car Crash Britain: Caught on Camera

Sport

 A-League Men (2022–present)
 A-League Women (2021–present)
 FIA Formula 1 World Championship (Highlight show)

Former programming

Comedy

 Back in the Game
 Common Law
 The Crazy Ones
 Dads
 Die On Your Feet
 Fast Forward
 Get Smart
 Happy Days
 Hogan's Heroes
 The Last Man on Earth
 Last Man Standing 
 The League
 M*A*S*H (Moved to 7two, then 7flix, now on 9Go!)
 The Millers
 Psych
 Raising Hope
 Sex & Drugs & Rock & Roll
 Sirens
 Wedding Band
 Whose Line Is It Anyway? (Now screening on FOX8 and the ABC)

Documentary

 An Idiot Abroad
 Black Ops
 Great Bear Stakeout with Billy Connolly
 The Longest Day
 Madagascar
 Megafactories
 Megastructures
 MegaStructures Breakdown
 Moments of Impact
 Monkeys Revealed
 Nature's Great Events
 Operation Repo
 Ross Noble's Australian Trip
 Ross Kemp: Back on the Frontline
 Ross Kemp: Middle East
 Ross Kemp: Return to Afghanistan
 Ross Kemp in Search of Pirates
 Sports Science
 Totally Wild
 Vanity Fair Confidential
 Whacked Out Sports
 Working With Dangerous Animals
 World's Busiest

Drama

 The Americans
 Awake
 Blue Bloods
 Burn Notice
 CSI: Cyber
 CSI: NY
 Elementary
 Extant
 Gang Related
 The Glades
 Graceland
 Highlander: The Series
 Homeland (moved to SBS)
 The Killing
 Legends
 Matlock
 Mr & Mrs Murder (Channel 10 encore)
 NYC 22
 Rush
 Sons of Anarchy
 Star Trek: Deep Space Nine
 Those Who Kill
 Touch
 Tyrant
 White Collar
 Zoo (Channel 10 encore)

Factual
 Emergency Search & Rescue
 Gold Coast Cops
 Territory Cops

Lifestyle

 4WD Touring Australia
 Big Fish Small Boats
 Blokesworld (moved to 7mate)
 Car Torque
 Driving Wars
 Escape with ET
 Extreme Boats Big Angry Fish
 Extreme Collectors
 Far Flung with Gary Mehigan
 Freddie Flintoff: Lord of the Fries
 Hardliners
 International Fishing Series
 Merv Hughes Fishing
 Ozzie Holiday
 Temporary Australians

Light Entertainment

 Can of Worms (Channel 10 encore)
 Darren & Brose
 Late Show with David Letterman
 Maxim TV

Game shows
 Celebrity Name Game
 Family Feud (Channel 10 simulcast)
 Jeopardy! (2008–2009 series only)
 Pointless (Channel 10 simulcast)

News and current affairs
 The Bolt Report (Channel 10 encore)

Reality

 Airline
 Beach Patrol
 Black Gold
 Bondi Ink Tattoo (10 Peach encore)
 Bondi Rescue (Channel 10 encore)
 Cops
 Cops: Adults Only
 Everest: Beyond the Limit
 Fear Factor
 Fight Master: Bellator MMA
 Firies
 Garage Gold
 GT Academy
 Hell's Kitchen
 Ice Road Truckers (Now on 7mate)
 MasterChef Australia (Channel 10 encore)
 Scrappers
 Shred
 Thrill Seekers
 World Class Bartender of the Year
 World's Toughest Trucker

Sport

 A-League
 Aussie Racing Cars
 Australian GT Championship
 Australian Rally Championship
 ANDRA Pro Series Drag Racing
 Aussie Millions Poker Championship
 Before the Game (except in VIC)
 The Back Page
 Bellator MMA
 Dunlop Super2 Series
 Esports Gfinity Elite Series Australia
 FIA Formula E Championship
 FIA World Rally Championship
 The Final Siren
 Football's Greatest Managers
 Football's Greatest Teams
 Football Stars of Tomorrow
 The Game Plan AFL
 The Game Plan NRL (Moved to Channel 10 in June 2012 in NSW and QLD only)
 Gillette World Sport
 Glory
 International Fishing Series
 Just for Kicks
 Monster Jam
 MySurf.tv
 NASCAR Sprint Cup Series
 NASCAR Nationwide Series
 MotoGP
 Netball: ANZ Championship 
 Netball: Constellation Cup
 Netball: International Series
 Netball World Cup
 Omnisport
 One Week at a Time AFL
 One Week at a Time NRL
 The Open Championship
 Porsche Carrera Cup Highlights
 NASCAR: Highlights 
 NHRA Camping World Drag Racing Series
 RPM
 The Road to Rio
 The Rugby Championship 
 Race to the Sky
 Socceroos
 Sports Tonight
 Supercars: Highlights 
 Super Rugby Extra Time 
 SuperUtes Series
 Targa Tasmania
 Trans-Tasman Muscle Car Battle
 Thursday Night Live
 The Western Front (Channel 10 encore)
 Wild Racers
 Women's Big Bash League 
 World Football News
 World Series Sprintcars
 World Skateboarding Championship
 World Sport

Major Sponsors
 Harvey Norman
 Hungry Jack's
 Mars Bar
 Panasonic
 Pokerstars.net
 Sportsbet
 Toyota (for Sports Tonight)

Sport rights
On 17 March 2009, Australian Swimming Championships was broadcast on 10 HD before the launch of 10 Bold on 26 March 2009 showing Live in 2009 until 2015.

In 2010, Both 10 & 10 Bold secured the rights for both Delhi 2010 & Glasgow 2014 also shared with Foxtel only 2010.

In October 2011, it was confirmed that the National Basketball League games would be delayed. During the 2012–13 season, some Friday night games were shown live on 10 Bold at 9.30 pm. Live Sunday games returned to 10 at 2pm.

By March 2012, sport was very much a secondary focus of 10 Bold. Sport is only shown when it clashes with 10's regular programming or as HD simulcast when it airs on 10. Moto GP races airs only on 10 Bold except for the Australian GP round which airs on 10 as well as 10 Bold as HD simulcast. F1 qualifying is shown on 10 Bold live while 10 replays later on.

10 Bold broadcast Formula One Grand Prix every qualifying session shown live with a half-hour preview. Rights to be held till 2014, including IPTV rights from 2011 to 2014 and in 2015 onwards Formula One shows a 1-hour highlight package at 9.30pm Mondays on One that aren't live on Network Ten while continuing with a simulcast on tenplay.

10 Bold broadcast Moto GP every race live (qualifying in highlights only from 2014 onwards) from 2010 till 2014, then from 2015 to 2016. Moto2 and Moto3 and MotoGP will be shown on the Australian Motorcycle Grand Prix round only on Ten.

10 Bold had previously showed NASCAR, between 2010 and 2014 airing both Sprint Cup and Nationwide Series highlights. Every NASCAR Sprint Cup race was shown live between 2011 and 2014.

10 Bold shows highlights for every round of Super Rugby every Sunday morning and replays of every Wallabies Test at around midday, that was previously shown on TEN from The Rugby Championship and Spring Tour

Availability
10 Bold is available in 1080i high definition from the network's five metropolitan owned-and-operated stations, TEN Sydney, ATV Melbourne, TVQ Brisbane, ADS Adelaide, and NEW Perth and is also available in regional Australia in 576i standard definition from Southern Cross Austereo's owned-and-operated stations, SGS/SCN in Spencer Gulf and Broken Hill, GLV/BCV in Regional Victoria, CTC in Southern New South Wales/Australian Capital Territory and TNQ in Regional Queensland. WIN Television through its owned-and-operated stations, NRN in Northern New South Wales, MGS/LRS in eastern South Australia, and MDN in Griffith and the MIA. Digital joint-venture stations, MDV in Mildura, TDT in Tasmania, WDT in regional Western Australia, DTD in Darwin, and CDT in Central Australia (including remote NT, QLD and SA) also broadcast 10 Bold but in 1080i high definition just like 10 Bold in 10’s O&O stations.

One was available to Foxtel cable subscribers via its HD+ package, and One SD was available on its basic cable service when it was broadcast.

Logo and identity history

Identity history
26 March 2009 – 7 May 2011: Sharing One Passion Sport/Sport Lives Here
7 May 2011 – 31 October 2018: It All Lives Here
10 December 2018 – 1 August 2020: It's better to be bold than bossy!
2 August 2020 — present: Heroes Live Here

See also

List of digital television channels in Australia

References

External links

Network 10
Digital terrestrial television in Australia
English-language television stations in Australia
Men's mass media
Men's interest channels
Television channels and stations established in 2009
2009 establishments in Australia